Keith de Jong (born 12 February 1956) is an Australian cricketer. He played in four first-class and two List A matches for Queensland in 1981/82.

See also
 List of Queensland first-class cricketers

References

External links
 

1956 births
Living people
Australian cricketers
Queensland cricketers
Cricketers from Colombo
Australian people of Sri Lankan descent
Sri Lankan people of Dutch descent